Eisenerz ("Iron ore") is a market place and old mining town in the Austrian state of Styria, . N.W. of Graz by rail. Pop. (2001) 6,400. It is situated in the deep Erzbach Valley, dominated on the east by the Pfaffenstein , on the west by the Kaiserschild , and on the south by the Erzberg . It has a medieval fortified church, a Gothic edifice founded by Rudolph of Habsburg in the 13th century and rebuilt in the 16th century.

At the turn of the past century the Erzberg (Ore Mountain) furnished such rich ore that it was quarried in the open air like stone, in the summer months. There is documentary evidence of the mines having been worked as far back as the 12th century. They afforded employment to two or three thousand hands in summer and about half as many in winter, and yielded some 800,000 tons of iron per annum. During World War II, a subcamp of Mauthausen concentration camp was located here. It provided slave labour for local industry. It passed through the pastoral scenery, before descending to Vordernberg, a center of the iron trade situated on the south side of the Erzberg. Eisenerz then possessed, in addition, twenty-five furnaces, which produce iron, and particularly steel, of high quality. Today the Erzberg is home to motocross races, called the Erzberg Rodeo.

Eisenerz is also the home of the independent record label Napalm Records, which is mainly focused on heavy metal and hard rock. While founded in 1992 in Eisenerz, the company has since become a prominent label in the metal scene, and today operates branch offices in Berlin and New York.

A few miles northwest of Eisenerz stands Leopoldstein Castle, and near it Leopoldstein Lake.

History
In Eisenerz, copper smelting was a major activity from the 15th century to the 13th century BC.

Population

References

Cities and towns in Leoben District